Adair José Guimarães (Mara Rosa, state of Goiás, Brazil, June 16, 1960) is a bishop at the Roman Catholic Diocese of Formosa, state of Goiás, Brazil.

He was bishop at the Roman Catholic Diocese of Rubiataba-Mozarlândia.

References 

Brazilian bishops

1960 births
Living people